Frosting or Frosted may refer to:
 Frost
 Icing (food), the sweet glaze used in confectionery
 FROSTING, a surveillance programme
 Frosting (crime), a form of vehicle theft
 Frosting (decorative arts), a motif in decoration of objects
 Frosted (band), a pop punk band
 Frosted (horse), a racehorse
 Aerosol burn